The Three Sea Wolves is an Australian television movie which first screened in 1980 on Channel 0/28 (later known as the SBS). It was based on a Greek play about an Italian actress who meets a young Greek.

The movie was screened on the evening of the first day the channel was on air in Australia.

References

External links

Australian television films
1980 television films
1980 films
Australian films based on plays
Special Broadcasting Service original programming